John McNeil (born March 23, 1948) is an American jazz trumpeter. He has performed with artists including Billy Hart, Rufus Reid, Horace Silver, Gerry Mulligan, and The Thad Jones/Mel Lewis Orchestra.

Discography

References

External links
 
 

1948 births
American jazz trumpeters
American male trumpeters
Living people
21st-century trumpeters
21st-century American male musicians
American male jazz musicians
SteepleChase Records artists
Sunnyside Records artists